David Anderson (born 8 December 1965) is an Australian former high jumper who competed in the 1992 Summer Olympics.

References

External links
 
 David Anderson at Australian Athletics Historical Results
 
 
 
 

1965 births
Living people
Australian male high jumpers
Olympic athletes of Australia
Athletes (track and field) at the 1982 Commonwealth Games
Athletes (track and field) at the 1990 Commonwealth Games
Athletes (track and field) at the 1992 Summer Olympics
Commonwealth Games competitors for Australia